Adalbert III of Bohemia (1145 – 8 April 1200), also called Vojtěch in Bohemia, was Archbishop of Salzburg between 1168 and 1177 and then again between 1183 and 1200. His reign is marked significantly from the struggle with Emperor Frederick I Barbarossa. He is listed as a Blessed of the Premonstratensians.

He was a son of Vladislaus II, Duke of Bohemia, and Gertrude of Babenberg, raised by Frederick I Barbarossa. He lived as a deacon in the Bohemian Strahov Monastery (Latinized: Mons Sion) in Prague.  After the death of his maternal uncle, Archbishop Conrad II of Salzburg, on 28 September 1168, Adalbert lived at first with Ulrich II of Aquileia, then as Provost of Mělník in Bohemia, honored by Papal legation, but without influence.

Literature 
 Meiller: Regesta archiepiscoporum Salisburgensium.
 Hans Prutz: Adalbert III.. In: Allgemeine Deutsche Biographie (ADB). Band 1, Duncker & Humblot, Leipzig 1875, S. 69–71.
 W. Schmidt: Die Stellung der Erzbischöfe von Salzburg u. das Erzstift von Salzburg zu Kirche und Reich unter K. Friedrich I.  Wien 1865.

References

1145 births
1200 deaths
Roman Catholic archbishops of Salzburg